Eleanor Burns (born July 3, 1945 in Zelienople, Pennsylvania) is a master quilter and former TV series host of Quilt in a Day, which aired in 1994 on PBS for six seasons.

Career 
Burns first started stitching on her Aunt Edna's feed sacks. Her first book, Make a Quilt in a Day: Log Cabin Pattern was self-published in 1978. The book has been credited with starting a quilt-making revolution as people learned Burns's style of stitching a quilt.

She has since written more than 100 books on the subject of quilting. In addition, Burns has written many patterns and developed a series of specialty rulers for quilting. The Quilt in a Day TV series, which first aired in 1990, was based on Burns' book Make a Quilt in a Day.

Award 
In 2012, Burns was inducted into the Quilters Hall of Fame.

List of publications 
 All Star Quilts
 Amish Quilt
 Applique in a Day 
 Bears in the Woods
 Birds in the Air 
 Boston Common Quilt
 Christmas Quilts and Crafts
 Cross Stitch Quilts
 Day & Night Quilt Book
 Delectable Mountains 
 Double Pinwheel Quilt
 Dutch Windmills
 Easy Strip Tulip
 Fans & Flutterbys Quilts
 Flying Geese Quilt in a Day
 Garden Lattic
 GO! Qube - Mix and Match Blocks and Quilts Book
 Go! Sampler Book
 Grandmother's Garden Quilt
 Hearts Delight-Nine Patch Variations
 It's 'El'ementary
 Jewel Box Quilt
 Last Minute Gifts
 Lover's Knot Placemats
 Lover's Knot Quilt
 Machine Quilting Primer
 Magic Vine Quilt
 Make a Quilt in a Day: Log Cabin Pattern (1978)
 May Basket
 Nana's Garden
 Northern Star
 Orion's Star Quilt
 Pineapple Quilt
 Quick Trip Quilts
 Quilt Blocks on American Barns
 Quilter's Almanac Block Party Three
 Quilts From El's Attic 
 Quilts from El's Kitchen
 Quilts Through the Seasons
 Recycled Treasures from Grandma's Attic
 Radiant Stars Quilts
 Schoolhouse Wallhanging
 Scrap Quilt
 Snowball Quilt Simplified
 Spools and Tools Wallhanging
 A Star For All Seasons
 Star Log Cabin
 Star Spangled Favorites
 Stars Across America Block Party Series Seven
 Still Stripping - After 25 Years
 Stockings and Small Quilts
 Sunbonnet Sue Visits Quilt in a Day
 Tales of First Ladies and Their Quilt Blocks
 Tennessee Waltz Quilt
 Trio of Treasured Quilts
 Triple Irish Chain
 Underground Railroad Sampler
 Victory Quilts
 Wild Goose Chase Quilts

Personal life 
Burns maintains a quilting studio at her Bear's Paw Ranch in Julian, California, a mountain town in San Diego County.

References

External links 
Author's official website
 

American textile designers
Living people
1945 births
People from Zelienople, Pennsylvania
People from Julian, California
Quilters